Vogel and De Vogel are surnames originating in German and Dutch-speaking countries. An alternate spelling is Fogel. Vogel is the German and Dutch word for "bird". Equivalent surnames are Bird or Byrd in English or L'Oiseau in French. Notable people with the surname include:

Academics
 Arthur Vogel (chemist) (1905–1966), British chemist
 Betsy Vogel Boze (born 1953), American academic and higher education administrator
 Cornelia Johanna de Vogel (1905–1986), Dutch classicist, philosopher and theologian
 Dan Vogel (born 1955), historian of Mormonism
 David Vogel (professor) (born 1949), American political scientist
 Detlef Vogel (born 1942), German historian
 Eduard Vogel (1829–1856), German astronomer and explorer in Central Africa
 Ezra Vogel (1930-2020), American Japanologist and author
 Friedrich Vogel (human geneticist) (1925–2006), German human geneticist
 Hans Vogel (scientist) (1900–1980), German helminthologist
 Hermann Carl Vogel (1841–1907), German astronomer
 Hermann Wilhelm Vogel (1834–1898), German photochemist and photographer
 J. Ph. Vogel (1871–1958), Dutch Sanskritist and epigraphist
 Johann Carl Vogel (1932–2012), South African physicist
 Johannes Vogel (botanist) (born 1963), German botanist
 Jörg Vogel (born 1967), German biologist
 Joseph Vogel (born 1981), American popular culture critic
 Julius Rudolph Theodor Vogel (1812–1841), German botanist
 Klaus Vogel (1930–2007), German legal scholar 
 Kurt Vogel (historian) (1888–1985), German historian of mathematics
 Louis Vogel (born 1954), French jurist and professor
 Marcel Vogel (1917–1991), American inventor and esotericist
 Michelle Vogel (born 1972), Australian-born film historian, author and editor
 Orville Vogel (1907–1991), American biologist
 Steven K. Vogel (born 1951), American political scientist, son of Ezra
 Steven Vogel (1940–2015), American biomechanics researcher
 Thomas Vogel (historian) (born 1959), German military historian
 Wolfgang Vogel (mathematician) (1940–1996), German mathematician

Arts

Poetry
 Johann Vogel (1589—1663), German poet

Music
 Allan Vogel (born 1944), American oboist
 Cristian Vogel (born 1972), British experimental electronic musician
 Edith Vogel (1912–1992), Austro-Hungarian classical pianist active in the UK
 Eric Vogel (1896–1980), Czech jazz trumpeter
 Harald Vogel (born 1941), German organist and author
 Janet Vogel (1941–1980), American pop singer
 Jaroslav Vogel (1894–1970), Czech conductor
 Johann Vogel (composer) (1756–1788), German composer
 Karsten Vogel (born 1943), Danish composer
 Lars Vogel (born 1982), Dutch metal musician and known as Lars NachtBraecker in Heidevolk
 Roger Craig Vogel (born 1947), American composer
 Sam Vogel (born 1993), American DJ and music producer known as Jauz
 Scott Vogel (born 1973), American rock singer
 Seja Vogel (born 1981), German-Australian singer-songwriter
 Siegfried Vogel (born 1937), German operatic bass
 Tyson Vogel (born 1981), American rock musician
 Vic Vogel (1935–2019), Canadian jazz musician
 Winston Dan Vogel (born 1943), Israeli-born American conductor
 Wladimir Vogel (1896–1984), Russian-born Swiss composer

Performing arts
 Albert Vogel (1874–1933), Dutch officer, teacher and performer
 Amos Vogel (1921–2012), Austrian-born American film critic
 Darlene Vogel (born 1962), American actress
 Ellen Vogel (1922–2015), Dutch television, film and stage actress
 Franz Vogel (1883–1956), German film producer
 Frederic B. Vogel (1925–2005), American theater producer and actor
 Friedemann Vogel (born 1979), German ballet dancer 
 Henry Vogel (1863–1925), American actor and bass-baritone singer 
 Jürgen Vogel (born 1968), German actor, screenwriter and film producer
 Matt Vogel (puppeteer) (born 1970), American puppeteer
 Mike Vogel (born 1979), American actor
 Mitch Vogel (born 1956), American actor
 Nicolas Vogel (1925–2006), French actor and comedian
 Nikolas Vogel (1932–1991), Austrian-German film actor and camera man
 Paul C. Vogel (1899–1975), American cinematographer
 Paula Vogel (born 1951), American playwright
 Peter Vogel (actor) (1937–1978), German film actor
 Rudolf Vogel (1900–1967), German film and television actor
 Tony Vogel (1942-2015), English actor
 Virgil W. Vogel (1919–1996), American television and film director

Visual arts
 Arthur Vogel (photographer) (1868–1962), German merchant, photographer and publisher
 Bernhard Vogel (engraver) (1683–1737), German engraver
 Carl Christian Vogel von Vogelstein (1788–1868), German painter
 Christa Frieda Vogel (born 1960), German photographer
 Christian Leberecht Vogel (1759–1816), German painter, draughtsman and writer on art
 Dorothy Vogel (born 1935), American art collector
 Franck Vogel (born 1977), French photojournalist and documentary film director
 Herbert Vogel (1922-2012), American art collector
 Hermann Vogel (French illustrator) (1856–1918), German-born French painter
 Hermann Vogel (German illustrator) (1854–1921), German illustrator
 Hugo Vogel (1855–1934), German painter
 Johannes Gijsbert Vogel (1828–1915), Dutch landscape painter
 Kate Vogel (born 1958), American studio glass artist
 Lillie Lewisohn Vogel (1876-1976), American art collector, philanthropist, and socialite
 Ludwig Vogel (1788–1879), Swiss painter
 Peter Vogel (artist) (1937–2017), German sound artist
 Speed Vogel (1918–2008), American sculptor and painter
 Zygmunt Vogel (1764–1826), Polish illustrator and painter

Business
 August H. Vogel (1862-1930), American businessman
 Frederick Vogel (1823–1892), German-born American tanner and businessman
 Jeff Vogel (born 1970), American video game developer and entrepreneur
 John W. Vogel (1863–1951), American white minstrel-show entrepreneur
 Joseph Vogel (executive) (1895–1969), American executive, president of MGM
 Paul Bernard Vogel (1899-1972), Swiss industrialist

Military
 Clayton Barney Vogel (1882–1964), American Marine Corps general
 Eduard Vogel von Falckenstein (1797–1885), Prussian general
 Emil Vogel (1894–1985), German World War II general
 Kurt Vogel (German officer) (1889-1967), German military officer

Politics and law
 Bernhard Vogel (born 1932), German Minister President of Rhineland-Palatinate and Thuringia
 Bob Vogel (politician) (born 1951), America (Minnesota) politician
 Bruce Vogel (born 1958), American (Minnesota) politician
 Carl M. Vogel (1955–2016), American (Missouri) politician
 Charles Joseph Vogel (1898–1980), American judge
 Elder Vogel (born 1956), American Pennsylvania state politician 
 Frank A. Vogel (1888–1951), American North Dakota politician and banker
 Georg Wilhelm Vogel (1743–1813), German jurist and mayor of Jena
 Hans Vogel (1881–1945), German politician
 Hans-Jochen Vogel (1926–2020), German politician
 Hugo E. Vogel (1888–1974), American (Wisconsin) politician
 Hunter Vogel (1903–1990), Canadian (British Columbian) politician
 Jill Vogel (born 1970), American politician and lawyer
 Johannes Vogel (born 1982), German politician
 Julius Vogel (1835–1899), New Zealand politician and Prime Minister
 Mel Vogel (1848–?), German-born American (California) politician
 Robert Vogel (US politician) (1919–2005), Justice on the North Dakota Supreme Court (son of Frank A. Vogel)
 Otto A. Vogel (1886–1951), American (Wisconsin) politician
 Sarah Vogel (born 1946), North Dakota politician and lawyer (granddaughter of Frank A. Vogel)
 Volkmar Vogel (born 1959), German politician
 William Vogel (born 1931), Canadian (British Columbia) politician
 Wolfgang Vogel (1925–2008), German lawyer

Religion
 Arthur A. Vogel (1924–2012), American Episcopal bishop
 Catherine Vogel (c. 1460–1539), Polish Jewish martyr
 Cyril John Vogel (1905–1979), American Roman Catholic prelate
 Hansjörg Vogel (born 1951), Swiss theologian
 Pierre Vogel (born 1978), German Islamist preacher and boxer

Sports
 Bob Vogel (born 1941), American football player
 Daniel Vogel (born 1991), Mexican footballer 
 Eberhard Vogel (born 1943), German footballer
 Florian Vogel (cyclist) (born 1982), Swiss racing cyclist
 Florian Vogel (swimmer) (born 1994), German swimmer
 Frank Vogel (born 1973), American professional basketball coach
 Gary Vogel (born 1956), American soccer defender
 Heiko Vogel (born 1975), German football manager
 Joe Vogel (born 1973), American-Lebanese basketball player
 Johann Vogel (born 1977), Swiss football midfielder
 Justin Vogel (born 1993), American football punter 
 Kristina Vogel (born 1990), German track cyclist
 Markus Vogel (born 1984), Swiss alpine ski racer
 Marvin Vogel (born 1985), Zimbabwean cricketer
 Matt Vogel (swimmer) (born 1957), American swimmer
 Nick Vogel (born 1990), American volleyball player
 Otto Vogel (1899–1969), American baseball player
 Peter Vogel (cyclist) (born 1939), Swiss cyclist
 Peter Vogel (footballer) (born 1952), German footballer
 Pia Vogel (born 1969), Swiss rower
 Rémy Vogel (1960–2016), French football defender
 Renate Vogel (born 1955), East German swimmer
 Richard Vogel (born 1964), Czech tennis player
 Robert Vogel (marksman) (born 1981), American sport shooter
 Sam Vogel (boxer) (1902–?), American Olympic boxer
 Sigfrido Vogel (1912–?), Argentine sports shooter
 Sydne Vogel (born 1979), American figure skater
 Ted Vogel (born 1925), American marathon runner
 Thomas Vogel (born 1965), German football coach and player
 Thomas Vogel (born 1967), German footballer
 Timothy Vogel (born 1960), New Zealand cricketer
 Turia Vogel (born 1969), Cook Islands windsurfer
 Wouter de Vogel (born 1990), Dutch footballer

Writing
 Alfred Vogel (1902–1996), Swiss herbalist and writer
 Bruno Vogel (1898–1987), German pacifist and writer
 Dan Vogel (born 1955), American author on Mormonism
 David Vogel (author) (1891–1944), Russian-born Hebrew poet, novelist, and diarist
 Debora Vogel (1902–1942), Polish philosopher and poet
 Eduard Vogel (1829–1856), German explorer
 Elise (Vogel) Polko (1822–1899), German novelist, sister of Eduard
 Henriette Vogel (1780–1811), German muse of the poet Heinrich von Kleist
 Ilse-Margret Vogel (1914–2001), German-American author
 Kenneth P. Vogel (born 1975), American journalist
 Nicole Vogel, American magazine publisher and author
 Nikolai Vogel (born 1971), German writer

Other
 Anita Vogel (born 1969), American television reporter
 Elise Vogel (1895–?), Latvian chess player
 Peter Vogel (banker) (born 1954), Polish murderer and later banker
 Peter Vogel (computer designer) (born 1954), Australian inventor and technologist
 Willem Thomas de Vogel (18681955), Dutch-Indonesian physician and official

Fictional characters
 Alex Vogel, a fictional character in the 2015 film The Martian (film)
 Burgomaster Vogel, a fictional character in the films Frankenstein (1931 film) and Bride of Frankenstein
 Christopher Vogel, a fictional character in the Fablehaven novels by Brandon Mull
 Colonel Vogel, fictional character in the 1989 film Indiana Jones and the Last Crusade
 Evelyn Vogel, a fictional character introduced in the eighth season of Dexter
 Dane Vogel, a fictional character in the 2008 video game Saints Row 2
 Lew Vogel, a fictional character in the 2008 film The Bank Job
Mathias Vogel, a fictional character in the 2018 film Tomb Raider
 Preston Vogel, a fictional character in the television series Gargoyles (TV series)
 Sabine Vogel, a fictional character in the 2017 video game Wolfenstein II: The New Colossus
 Viktor Vogel, titular character of the comedy film Viktor Vogel – Commercial Man
 Walter Vogel, a fictional character in the 2009 novel Princess of the Midnight Ball by Jessica Day George. He also appears in the sequel Princess of the Silver Woods.
 Warden Vogel, a fictional character in the television series Futurama''

See also
 Fogel
 Vogl
 Vogle
 Vogels

Dutch-language surnames
German-language surnames
Yiddish-language surnames
Jewish surnames
Surnames from nicknames